Lipmann Kessel, MBE, MC, FRCS (19 December 1914 – 5 June 1986), was a famous orthopaedic surgeon and Second World War medical officer, often known by his nickname of Lippy.

Battle of Arnhem

Born in Pretoria, Transvaal, Union of South Africa, he was involved at the Battle of Arnhem where at the time he was a captain in the Royal Army Medical Corps (RAMC), assigned to the 16th (Parachute) Field Ambulance.  He is credited with saving the life of Brigadier Sir John Winthrop Hackett Junior when he operated on him for a severe abdominal wound at the St. Elisabeth Hospital in Arnhem.

Kessel had the curious experience of looking out of a window in the St Elizabeth Hospital and seeing the division's General Officer Commanding (GOC) Major General Urquhart, who was in charge of the whole battle at Arnhem, running along the street.  It was not until after the battle that he found out that the general was just about to enter a house where he would stay surrounded by Germans for over 30 hours.

When he first entered the St. Elizabeth Hospital, he spoke to the Dutch staff in Afrikaans (which he had learned as a child in South Africa), because he had always been told it was similar to Dutch. The staff took offence at this, as to them it sounded like German, and he was told in no uncertain terms to always speak English.

Kessel, who was Jewish, was taken prisoner at Arnhem, but later escaped and has told his story in his book Surgeon at Arms, published in 1958.

Later life

After the war Kessel became a very successful surgeon based in London, and Emeritus Professor of Orthopaedics at the University of London.

When he died on 5 June 1986 he was buried, as was his wish, in Arnhem Civil Cemetery, in order to be close to the men who died at the battle of Arnhem, who are buried in the nearby Arnhem Oosterbeek War Cemetery.

Publications 

 Surgeon at Arms, 1958, 
Surgeon at Arms, 2011,

References

"I Was a Stranger" by General Sir John Hackett (Sphere Books).  Hacketts memoir confirms Lipmann Kessel carried out urgent and life saving abdominal surgery at St Elizabeths Hospital, Arnhem

1914 births
1986 deaths
South African Jews
South African Members of the Order of the British Empire
South African orthopaedic surgeons
South African writers
British Army personnel of World War II
Royal Army Medical Corps officers
Fellows of the Royal College of Surgeons
People from Pretoria
Operation Pegasus
British orthopaedic surgeons
20th-century surgeons